Princess Mathilde of Waldeck and Pyrmont (10 April 1801 – 13 April 1825) was a member of the House of Waldeck and Pyrmont and a Princess of Waldeck and Pyrmont and a member of the House of Württemberg and a Duchess of Württemberg through her marriage to Duke Eugen of Württemberg

Early life
Mathilde was born in Rhoden, Principality of Waldeck and Pyrmont was the fourth daughter and tenth child George I, Prince of Waldeck and Pyrmont and his first wife Princess Auguste of Schwarzburg-Sondershausen.

Marriage and issue 

On 21 January 1817, in Arolsen, she married Duke Eugen of Württemberg (1788–1857, son of Duke Eugen of Württemberg (1758–1822) and Princess Luise of Stolberg-Gedern (1764-1828), first cousin of the better known Countess of Albany.
They had three children:
Duchess Marie of Württemberg (25 March 1818 – 10 April 1888), married in 1845 to Charles II, Landgrave of Hesse-Philippsthal, had issue.
Duke Eugen of Württemberg (25 December 1820 – 8 January 1875), married in 1843 to Princess Mathilde of Schaumburg-Lippe, had issue.
Duke William Alexander of Württemberg (13 April 1825 – 15 April 1825)

Mathilde died while giving birth to her third child. In 1827, Eugene remarried to Princess Helene of Hohenlohe-Langenburg with whom he had four children.

Ancestry

House of Waldeck and Pyrmont
1801 births
1825 deaths
People from Waldeck (state)
Princesses of Waldeck and Pyrmont
Duchesses of Württemberg
Deaths in childbirth
Daughters of monarchs